A spark-ignition engine (SI engine) is an internal combustion engine, generally a petrol engine, where the combustion process of the air-fuel mixture is ignited by a spark from a spark plug. This is in contrast to compression-ignition engines, typically diesel engines, where the heat generated from compression together with the injection of fuel is enough to initiate the combustion process, without needing any external spark.

Fuels
Spark-ignition engines are commonly referred to as "gasoline engines" in North America, and "petrol engines" in Britain and the rest of the world. Spark-ignition engines can (and increasingly are) run on fuels other than petrol/gasoline, such as autogas (LPG), methanol, ethanol, bioethanol, compressed natural gas (CNG), hydrogen, and (in drag racing) nitromethane.

Working cycle
The working cycle of both spark-ignition and compression-ignition engines may be either two-stroke or four-stroke.

A four-stroke spark-ignition engine is an Otto cycle engine. It consists of following four strokes: suction or intake stroke, compression stroke, expansion or power stroke, exhaust stroke. Each stroke consists of 180 degree rotation of crankshaft rotation and hence a four-stroke cycle is completed through 720 degree of crank rotation. Thus for one complete cycle there is only one power stroke while the crankshaft turns by two OR MORE revolutions

See also
Multifuel engine

References

Spark plugs
Internal combustion piston engines